West High School was a public high school in the Akron Public School District that served the city of Akron, Ohio from 1913 until 1953. The 'West Cowboys athletics team competed in the Akron City Series.

History
West High School was originally built in 1913. In 1953, the building was converted into West Junior High School, which remained open until 1980. The building then became apartments for senior citizens.

Notable alumni
 Sterling Tucker, Washington D.C. politician and mayoral candidate.

References

High schools in Akron, Ohio
Public high schools in Ohio
Defunct schools in Ohio